Anne Lynch may refer to:

 Anne Lynch Botta (1815–1891), American poet, writer, teacher and socialite
 Anne Lynch (artist) (born 1956), Australian artist